James Sampson may refer to:
 James Sampson (physician) (1789–1861), Irish-born physician and politician in Upper Canada
 Jum Sampson (c. 1876–?), Australian rugby player